The Vodacom Championship was an annual golf tournament on the Sunshine Tour. It was inaugurated in 2001 as part of the rebranding of the old Southern Africa Tour, and being the last event on the schedule, it was titled as The Tour Championship, but was renamed when the tour switched to a calendar based season in 2007.

The event took place in February each year, and was last held at the Pretoria Country Club in Pretoria, Gauteng Province, South Africa, with a prize fund in 2010 of 2.65 million rand.

Winners

External links
Sunshine Tour - official site

Former Sunshine Tour events
Golf tournaments in South Africa